Senator Rainey may refer to:

Joseph Rainey (1832–1887), South Carolina State Senate
Richard Rainey (fl. 1980s–1990s), California State Senate